

Rudolf Hübner (29 April 1897 – 28 February 1965) was a German general during World War II. He was a recipient of the Knight's Cross of the Iron Cross of Nazi Germany.

Hübner entered the Army during the First World War on 25 July 1916 as a volunteer in the replacement battalion of the Grenadier Regiment "Prince Carl of Prussia" (2nd Brandenburg) No. 12 a. In 1916 he came with the 4th Lower Silesian Infantry Regiment No. 51 to the front. From 1917 until the end of the war he was with the Sturm Battalion No. 16. In this he was promoted to lieutenant on 27 September 1918 and then commanded to an officer's course, where he experienced the end of the war. On November 28, 1918 he was released from active service.

He then began studying dentistry, which he received as a doctor. med. dent. Graduating. Subsequently Hübner worked as a practical dentist.

In 1934 he joined as a supplementary officer candidate in the Reichswehr. In the spring of 1935 he was employed as a company commander in the supplementary battalion Oppeln A (later supplementary battalion 41) and appointed on 1 June 1935 supplementary officer. On July 15, 1936 followed in the course of the upgrade of the Wehrmacht its acquisition into active service. On March 1, 1937, he was appointed chief of the 6th Company in Infantry Regiment 18.

In the mobilization before the Second World War, he was appointed company commander in the Infantry Regiment 167, which belonged to the 86th Infantry Division, appointed. In late January 1940, he was appointed commander of the Second Battalion of the Infantry Regiment 529 and promoted to Major on 1 March 1940. The battalion he led in the Western campaign, which ended on June 22, 1940 with the capitulation of France. On April 1, 1942, he was promoted to lieutenant colonel. On April 9, 1942 he was charged with the leadership of the 529th Infantry Regiment, which belonged to the 299th Infantry Division. On August 26, 1942, he was appointed commander of the 529th Infantry Regiment. From its renaming in October 1942, he was commander of the Grenadier Regiment 529th On December 1, 1942 he was promoted to colonel. On April 21, 1943, he was awarded the German Cross in Gold. In May 1943, Hübner issued his memorandum on military education (Title: What do we fight for?), which was distributed to the officer corps by the Wehrmacht High Command (OKW) with 300,000 copies. On July 1, 1943, he gave his command and was transferred to the Führerreserve. In September 1943 he was transferred to the army personnel office. From spring 1944 he was commanded to the National Socialist command staff of the OKW (see National Socialist management officer).

From 1 August 1944 he was appointed Chief of Staff by the National Socialist Command Staff of the OKH. On 1 January 1945 he was promoted to Major General. On February 1, 1945, he gave his command and was simultaneously charged with the leadership of the 303rd Infantry Division. On March 1, 1945, he was promoted to lieutenant general and eight days later awarded the Knight's Cross of the Iron Cross. 

Hitler was incensed by the loss of the Ludendorff Bridge during the Battle of Remagen on 7 March 1945. He summoned the "fanatical and reliable Nazi" Generalleutnant Hübner from the Eastern Front and personally appointed him Commander of Fliegendes Sonder-Standgericht West ("Flying Special Court-Martial West"). He directed him to court-martial and execute the officers who failed to destroy the bridge.

General Hubner tried Major Hans Scheller, Captain Willi Bragte, Lt. Karl Heinz Peters, Maj. Herbert Strobel and Maj. August Kraft. 

Hübner, who had no legal experience, acted as both prosecutor and judge. He conducted extremely brief show trials during which he harangued the defendants for their alleged command failures, and then pronounced sentence. All of the officers were sentenced to death. Except for Bratge, who had been captured, the others were taken to a nearby woods within 24 hours, executed with a shot to the back of the neck, and buried where they fell. 

On April 28, 1945 Hübner was appointed on command of Albert Kesselring commander of combat of Munich. Under his command, 200 people were hanged or shot in the last days of the war. Hübner "left quietly" (quote Henke), as Munich was taken on April 30, 1945.  On May 8, 1945 Hübner was first in US American, later in British captivity. From this he was released in April 1948.

In a post-war trial in Koblenz he was sentenced to four years in prison for the death sentences of Rimbach.

Awards 

 Knight's Cross of the Iron Cross on 9 March 1945 as Generalmajor and leader of Grenadier-Regiment 529

References

Citations

Bibliography

 

1897 births
1965 deaths
Lieutenant generals of the German Army (Wehrmacht)
German Army personnel of World War I
Recipients of the Gold German Cross
Recipients of the Knight's Cross of the Iron Cross
People from Posen-West Prussia